Indian Creek Township is one of twelve townships in Pulaski County, Indiana, United States. As of the 2010 census, its population was 691 and it contained 422 housing units.

Indian Creek Township was organized in 1842, and named after Indian Creek.

Geography

Unincorporated towns
 Pulaski at 
(This list is based on USGS data and may include former settlements.)

Adjacent townships
 Monroe Township (north)
 Harrison Township (northeast)
 Van Buren Township (east)
 Cass Township, White County (south)
 Liberty Township, White County (southwest)
 Beaver Township (west)
 Jefferson Township (northwest)

Cemeteries
The township contains these three cemeteries: Hoover, Indian Creek and Saint Joseph's.

Airports and landing strips
 Allen Airport

Major highways
  Indiana State Road 119

Education
 Eastern Pulaski Community School Corporation

Indian Creek Township residents may obtain a free library card from the Pulaski County Public Library in Winamac.

Political districts
 Indiana's 2nd congressional district
 State House District 16
 State Senate District 18

References
 United States Census Bureau 2008 TIGER/Line Shapefiles
 United States Board on Geographic Names (GNIS)
 IndianaMap

External links
 Indiana Township Association
 United Township Association of Indiana

Townships in Pulaski County, Indiana
Townships in Indiana